Dhoki may refer to,

Dhoki, Parner, village in Ahmednagar district of Maharashtra state of India
Dhoki, Osmanabad, village in Osmanabad district of Maharashtra  state of India

See also 
Doki (disambiguation)